The discography of Eddie Dee, a Puerto Rican singer-songwriter and recording artist, consists of two studio albums, two compilation albums, a mixtape, and two recompilation albums as of December 2015.

Eddie Dee began his career in 1990 and launched his debut studio album three years later. His second album became popular in Puerto Rico and was titled Tagwut in 1997. It featured the hit single "Señor Official". His following releases El Terrorista de la Lírica (2000) and Biografía (2001), too enjoyed underground success. The 2004 album 12 Discípulos is regarded as "the greatest reggaetón various artist album of all time". The album features songs by some of the most successful reggaetón artist, including the intro of the album, where they all come together as one to show that "unity is needed for the genre reggaetón to survive and evolve". It was a collaboration between eleven other artist including Daddy Yankee, Tego Calderon, Ivy Queen, and Vico C among others, who were among the most requested at the time. The track, known as "Los 12 Discípulos" or "Quítate Tu Pa' Ponerme Yo" reached number eight on the Billboard Tropical Songs chart, and was nominated for a 2005 Billboard Latin Music Award for "Tropical Airplay Track of the Year, New Artist". The album itself reached number one on the Billboard Tropical Albums chart for three nonconsecutive weeks.

Albums 
Studio albums

Compilation albums

Mixtapes

Recompilation albums

Singles

Music videos

As lead artist

As guest artist

Collaborations

As lead artist

As guest artist

Appearances in compilation albums

Credits as lyricist only

References

Notes 

Discographies of Puerto Rican artists